Lastola is a rural locality (a village) and the administrative center of Lastolskoye Rural Settlement of Primorsky District, Arkhangelsk Oblast, Russia. The population was 443 as of 2010. There are 7 streets.

Geography 
Lastola is located 29 km northwest of Arkhangelsk (the district's administrative centre) by road. Onishovo is the nearest rural locality.

References 

Rural localities in Primorsky District, Arkhangelsk Oblast